İstisu may refer to:
İstisu, Ismailli, Azerbaijan
İstisu, Kalbajar, Azerbaijan
İstisu, Lankaran, Azerbaijan